Chhatri are elevated, dome-shaped pavilions used as an element in Indo-Islamic architecture and Indian architecture. Originating as a canopy above tombs, they serve as decorative elements. The earliest example of chhatri being used in the Indian Subcontinent were found in the Shrine of Ibrahim in Bhadreswar, constructed between 1159 and 1175 AD.

Chhatri are found particularly within Mughal architecture. The most notable surviving examples today are to be found at Humayun's Tomb in Delhi and the Taj Mahal in Agra. The Berar Sultanate in the Deccan added chhatris on buildings in its various capitals. Chhatri have also been used in Rajasthan and other parts of the Indian Subcontinent by both Muslim and Hindu rulers. Its origins are, however, Indo-Islamic. While chhatri in Shekhawati may consist of a simple structure of one dome raised by four pillars to a building containing many domes and a basement with several rooms. In some places, the interior of the chhatri is painted in the same manner as the haveli (mansions) of the region.

In Rajasthan
Many other chhatri exist in other parts of Rajasthan. Their locations include:
Jaipur – Gaitore Cenotaphs of the Maharajas of Jaipur. Set in a narrow valley, the cenotaphs of the former rulers of Jaipur consist of the somewhat typical chhatri or umbrella-shaped memorials. Sawai Jai Singh II's Chhatri is particularly noteworthy because of the carvings that have been used to embellish it.
Jodhpur – Jaswant Thada, the white marble chhatri of Maharaja Jaswant Singh II. The Panchkunda Ki Chhatriyan at Mandore are a group of chhatri built on early cremation grounds of Marwar royal family.
Bharatpur- the cenotaphs of the members of the Jat royal family of Bharatpur, who perished whilst fighting against the British in 1825, are erected in the town of Govardhan. The chhatri of Maharaja Suraj Mal of Bharatpur has fine frescos illuminating the life of Surajmal, vividly depicting darbar and hunting scenes, royal processions and wars.
Udaipur- Flanked by a row of enormous stone elephants, the Lake Pichola island has an impressive chhatri carved from gray blue stone, built by Maharana Jagat Singh.
Haldighati – A beautiful Chhatri with white marble columns, dedicated to Rana Pratap, stands here. Chetak Smarak, the cenotaph dedicated to Chetak, Rana Pratap's famous horse, is also noteworthy.
Alwar – Moosi Maharani ki Chhatri is a beautiful red sandstone and white marble cenotaph of the rulers of Alwar.
Bundi – Suraj Chhatri and Mordi Ki Chhatri, Chaurasi Khambon ki Chhatri, Bundi and Nath Ji ki Chhatri are located in Bundi. Rani Shyam Kumari wife of Raja Chhatrasal on the northern hill constructed the Suraj Chhatri and Mayuri the second wife of Chhatrasal on the southern hill erected Mordi Ki Chhatri.
 Jaisalmer – Bada Bagh, a complex with chhatris of Jai Singh II (d. 1743) and subsequent Maharajas of Jaisalmer.
Bikaner – Devi Kund near Bikaner is the royal crematorium place with a number of cenotaphs. The chhatri of Maharaja Surat Singh is most imposing. It has the spectacular Rajput paintings on the ceilings.
Ramgarh – Seth Ram Gopal Poddar Chhatri
Nagaur – Nath Ji ki Chhatri, Amar Singh Rathore-ki-Chhatri

In Shekhawati
Some of the best-known chhatri in the Shekhawati region of Rajasthan are located in the following cities and towns:

Ramgarh – Ram Gopal Poddar Chhatri
Laxmangarh - Churiwala ki Chhatri
 Bissau – The Raj ki Chhatri of the Shekhawat Thakurs
Parsurampura –  Thakur Sardul Singh Shekhawat's chhatri
Jhunjhunu – Chhatri of Shekhawat Rulers
Dundlod – The beautiful chhatri of Ram Dutt Goenka
Mukungarh – Shivdutta Ganeriwala Chhatri
Churu – Taknet Chhatri
Mahansar – The Sahaj Ram Poddar Chhatri
Udaipurwati – Joki Das Shah ki Chhatri
Fatehpur – Jagan Nath Singhania Chhatri

In Madhya Pradesh

The region of Madhya Pradesh is the site of several other notable chhatri of its famous Maratha rulers:

Shujalpur – Tomb of Ranoji Scindia, founder of the Scindia dynasty. Situated at Ranoganj, Shujalpur to Akodia Road.
Shivpuri – Intricately embellished marble chhatri erected by Scindia rulers in Shivpuri.
Gwalior – Shrimati Balabai Maharaj Ladojirao Shitole Chhatri
Gwalior – Rajrajendra Ramchandrarao Narsingh Shitole and wife Gunwantyaraje Ramchandrarao Shitole (princess of Gwalior) Chatri
Orchha – Elaborate chhatri of local Hindu kings 
Gohad – The Jat rulers of Gohad constructed the chhatri of Maharaja Bhim Singh Rana on the Gwalior Fort.
Indore and Maheshwar – Chhatri of Holkar rulers.
Alampur – Maharani Ahilya Bai Holkar built the chhatri of Malhar Rao Holkar at Alampur in Bhind district in 1766.

Mughal architecture

Chhatri were features in many buildings of Mughal architecture:
The Taj Mahal has four Chhatris surrounding the Main Dome 
Humayun's Tomb has several Chhatris nead the dome. 
The Panch Mahal, Fatehpur Sikri is crowned with a domed chhatri that overlooks the men's area.

In Kutch

Chhatri can also be found in the outskirts of Bhuj city belonging mainly to Jadeja rulers of Kutch. The chhatri of Rao Lakhpatji is very famous for its intricate designs & carvings. Most of them but have been destroyed in the 2001 Gujarat earthquake. The restoration work is going on.

Outside India

There are two notable chhatri in the United Kingdom, a country with strong historical links to India. One is a cenotaph in Brighton, dedicated to the Indian soldiers who died in the First World War.

The other is in Arnos Vale Cemetery near Bristol and is a memorial to the distinguished Indian reformer Raja Ram Mohan Roy, who died in that city.

See also
Cenotaph
Chahartaq (architecture)
Cupola
Jaswant Ki Chhatri
Roof lantern
Chattri, Brighton, a memorial to Indian soldiers

References

External links

 ArchNet Dictionary of Islamic Architecture: Chatri
Images of old chhatris Columbia University

Rajasthani architecture
Architecture in India
Maratha architecture
Mughal architecture elements
Monuments and memorials in India
Hindi words and phrases
Cenotaphs in India
Buildings and structures in Rajasthan
Hindu architecture
Islamic architectural elements